The Jones Mountains are an isolated group of mountains, trending generally east–west for 43 km (27 mi), situated on the Eights Coast, Ellsworth Land, about 80 km (50 mi) south of Dustin Island in Antarctica. The charts of the USAS, 1939–41, show mountains in this approximate location and relationship to Dustin and Thurston Islands, indicating they were sighted in the flight from the ship Bear, February 27, 1940. The mountains appear in distant air photos taken by US Navy Operation Highjump, December 30, 1946, and were observed from USN aircraft by Edward Thiel and J. Campbell Craddock, January 22, 1960.

The naming was proposed by Thiel and Craddock after Dr. Thomas O. Jones (1908–93), American chemist; senior NSF official in charge of the U.S. Antarctic Research Program, 1958–78; Director, Division of Environmental Science, NSF, 1965–69; Deputy Assistant Director for National and International Programs, NSF, 1969–78.

They were mapped by the University of Minnesota Jones Mountains Party, 1960–61, and so named by the party because the cliffs were visited on Christmas Day of 1960.

See also
 Granite Spur
 Greenstone Point
 Intrusive Spur
 Pond Ridge

References

Mountain ranges of Ellsworth Land
Volcanoes of Ellsworth Land
Miocene volcanoes